Midtown Park may refer to:

Midtown Park (Charlotte, North Carolina), United States
Midtown Park, a park in Midtown, Houston, United States